Gyula Hernádi (23 August 1926 – 20 July 2005) was a Hungarian writer and screenwriter. He wrote for 36 films between 1965 and 2005, mostly for director Miklós Jancsó. He also wrote many novels, mostly surrealistic science fiction or horror stories with unique twists.

Selected filmography
 The Round-Up (1965)
 The Confrontation (1969)
 Red Psalm (1971)
 Electra, My Love (1974)
 The Fortress (1979)
 Season of Monsters (1987)
 Jesus Christ's Horoscope (1989)

External links

1926 births
2005 deaths
Hungarian writers
Male screenwriters
Hungarian male writers
People from the Bratislava Region
20th-century Hungarian screenwriters